Chettipalayam railway station is a suburban railway station of Coimbatore situated in Coimbatore–Pollachi line. The station became defunct in the 2000s. Several  protests have been made to reopen the railway station.

References

External links 

Defunct railway stations in India
Salem railway division
Railway stations in Coimbatore